Kazimierz Talarczyk (2 February 1920 in Poznań – 6 May 1972 in Kłodzko) was a Polish film and theater actor.

He played at the Theatre Actor and Dolls in Poznan from 1948 to 1949, and touring the Drama Theatre of the Polish Army in Warsaw (1949 to 1950), the Polish Theatre in Poznan (1950 to 1953), the Coastal Theatre in Gdańsk (1953 to 1961, and 1962 to 1966), Powszechny Theater in Warsaw (1961, and 1966 to 1967) and the Stefan Jaracz Theatre in Lodz (1967 to 1972). He was the father of actor Roman Talarczyk. He died in 1972, and his grave is located in the parish cemetery in Wolsztyn.

Filmography
 Chłopi - a resident of Lipiec
 Czterej pancerni i pies - major Rosomaka 
 How I Unleashed World War II - Woydyłło
 Przygody pana Michała - Noble
 Sami swoi - Antoni Wieczorek
 Stawka większa niż życie - Wehrmacht commander 
 Gdzie jest generał... - Russian colonel
 Na białym szlaku (1962)

External links
http://www.imdb.com/name/nm1284553/

1920 births
1972 deaths
Actors from Poznań
Polish male actors